The sermons and speeches of Martin Luther King Jr., comprise an extensive catalog of American writing and oratory – some of which are internationally well-known, while others remain unheralded and await rediscovery.

Martin Luther King Jr. was a prominent African-American clergyman, a leader in the civil rights movement and a Nobel Peace Prize laureate.

King himself observed, "In the quiet recesses of my heart, I am fundamentally a clergyman, a Baptist preacher."

Speechwriter and orator
The famous "I Have a Dream" address was delivered in August 1963 from the steps of the Lincoln Memorial in Washington, D.C.  Less well-remembered are the early sermons of that young, 25-year-old pastor who first began preaching at the Dexter Avenue Baptist Church in Montgomery, Alabama, in 1954.  As a political leader in the Civil Rights Movement and as a modest preacher in a Baptist church, King evolved and matured across the span of a life cut short.  The range of his rhetoric was anticipated and encompassed within "The Three Dimensions of a Complete Life," which he preached as his trial sermon at Dexter Avenue Baptist Church in 1954 and every year thereafter for the rest of his life.

Sermons
 1953 – "The Three Dimensions of a Complete Life" 
 1954 – "Rediscovering Lost Values", Sunday February 28, Detroit, Michigan.
 1955 - "The Impassable Gulf (The Parable of Dives and Lazarus)", Sunday October 2, Dexter Avenue Baptist Church, Montgomery, Alabama.
 1956 - "The Death of Evil Upon the Seashore", Wednesday May 17, Cathedral of St. John the Divine, New York City
 1956 - "Living Under the Tensions of Modern Life", Sunday September (exact date unknown), Dexter Avenue Baptist Church, Montgomery, Alabama. 
 1956 – "Paul's Letter to American Christians", Sunday November 4, Dexter Avenue Baptist Church, Montgomery, Alabama.
 1957 – "The Birth of a New Nation", Sunday April 7, Dexter Avenue Baptist Church, Montgomery, Alabama.
 1957 – "Garden of Gethsemane", Sunday April 14, Dexter Avenue Baptist Church, Montgomery, Alabama.
 1957 – "Loving Your Enemies", Sunday November 17, Dexter Avenue Baptist Church, Montgomery, Alabama.
 1960 – "Why Jesus Called A Man A Fool", Sunday May 15, Ebenezer Baptist Church, Atlanta
Possibly the first time King delivered a variation of this sermon, see 27 August 1967 below
 1963 – "Eulogy for the Martyred Children" (victims of 16th Street Baptist Church bombing), Wednesday September 18, Birmingham, Alabama
 1966 – "Guidelines for a Constructive Church", Sunday June 5, Ebenezer Baptist Church, Atlanta
 1967 – "The Three Dimensions Of A Complete Life", Sunday April 9, New Covenant Baptist Church, Chicago.
 1967 - "Three Evils of Society" Address Delivered to the First Annual National Conference for New Politics
 1967 - "The Casualties of the War in Vietnam" Address delivered at the Nation Institute
 1967 – "Why Jesus Called A Man A Fool", Sunday August 27, Mt. Pisgah Missionary Baptist Church, Chicago 
Possibly the last time King delivered a variation of this sermon, which started at least as early as May 15, 1960 (see above)
 1967 – "A Knock at Midnight", Delivered on several occasions, including the Installation Service of Ralph Abernathy at Atlanta's West Hunter Baptist Church February 11, 1962.
 1968 – "The Drum Major Instinct", Sunday February 4, Ebenezer Baptist Church, Atlanta.
1968 – "Remaining Awake Through a Great Revolution", Sunday March 31, National Cathedral, Washington, D.C.
King's last Sunday sermon.
 1968 – "I've Been to the Mountaintop", Wednesday April 3, Mason Temple, Memphis, Tennessee.
 1968 – "Why America May Go to Hell", planned to be delivered on Sunday April 7, but never delivered due to his assassination.

Speeches

Notes

 Speech given at McFarlin Auditorium, Southern Methodist University March 17, 1966, drawn from same sources as April 10, 1957 St. Louis, Mo. speech.

References
 Fuller, Linda K. (2004).  National Days/National Ways: Historical, Political, And Religious Celebrations Around The World. Westport, Connecticut: Greenwood Publishing Group. 
 Lischer, Richard. (1997).  The Preacher King: Martin Luther King Jr. and the Word That Moved America. New York: Oxford University Press.

External links

 "Why I Am Opposed to the War in Vietnam" 1967 -- see 
 "A Knock at Midnight," 1967 -- see 
 '"Beyond Vietnam," 1967
 A longer list of speeches & sermons
 Martin Luther King: His Triumphs - a slideshow by Life magazine
Tavis Smiley on Rev. Martin Luther King and His Opposition to the Vietnam War - video by Democracy Now!
 "Episode 2 -- MLK: A Call to Conscience: -- Tavis Smiley Reports. The second episode of Tavis Smiley Reports examines Martin Luther King Jr.'s stand against the Vietnam War and the influence of his legacy today. Tavis speaks with scholars and friends of King, including Cornel West, Vincent Harding and Susannah Heschel." March 31, 2010.
 Valeria Franceschi, Remembering the Reverend: An Analysis of Obama's Speeches Commemorating Martin Luther King (October 2016)

Civil rights movement
Martin Luther King Jr.
King, Martin Luther
King